Texas Terrors is a 1940 American Western film directed by George Sherman and written by Doris Schroeder and Anthony Coldeway. The film stars Don "Red" Barry, Julie Duncan, Arthur Loft, Al St. John, Eddy Waller and William Ruhl. It was released on November 22, 1940 by Republic Pictures.

Plot

Cast 
Don "Red" Barry as Bob Millbourne aka Robert Mills
Julie Duncan as Jane Bennett
Arthur Loft as Olin Blake
Al St. John as Frosty Larson
Eddy Waller as Judge Charles Bennett
William Ruhl as Henchman Ashley
Ann Pennington as Dancer
Sammy McKim as Bob as a Boy
Reed Howes as Henchman Ed
Robert Fiske as Defense Attorney Barker
Fred Toones as Snowflake

References

External links
 

1940 films
1940s English-language films
American Western (genre) films
1940 Western (genre) films
Republic Pictures films
Films directed by George Sherman
American black-and-white films
1940s American films